M Health Fairview is a healthcare brand that represents the collaboration among three separate entities; the University of Minnesota Medical School, University of Minnesota Physicians, and Fairview Health Services.

History

Fairview Health Services
Fairview Health Services is a nonprofit, integrated health system based in Minneapolis, Minnesota. It provides health care across the full spectrum of health care services. Fairview currently  operates ten hospitals, including M Health Fairview University of Minnesota Medical Center, forty eight primary care clinics and numerous specialty clinics in the Minneapolis-St. Paul metropolitan area and greater Minnesota. Fairview has 32,000 employees and 2,400 affiliated providers. 

In June 2010, Thomson Reuters identified Fairview Health Services as one of the top ten health care systems in the United States.  The University of Minnesota Medical Center in Minneapolis was also recently recognized by U.S. News & World Report as a top hospital in the United States for treatment in six different specialties.  In January 2011, HealthGrades listed Fairview Ridges in Burnsville and Fairview Southdale in Edina as "Distinguished Hospitals for Clinical Excellence," with each ranking in the top 5% of hospitals in the area.
In October 2016, James Hereford, former COO of Stanford Health Care, became CEO of Fairview.

In May 2017, Fairview announced they were merging with HealthEast Care System which serves primarily St. Paul and the eastern suburbs of the Twin Cities. The combined Fairview/HealthEast has approximately 33,200 employees.

M Health Fairview
 
Starting on January 1, 2019, M Health Fairview became a partnership and brand that represents the collaboration among three separate entities: the University of Minnesota Medical School, University of Minnesota Physicians, and Fairview Health Services. 

As of November 8, 2019 M Health Fairview had about 34,000 employees. They have 10 hospitals and about 60 clinics with multiple services offered.

References

External links 
 
 

Hospital networks in the United States
Health care companies based in Minnesota
Companies based in Minneapolis
Non-profit corporations
2019 establishments in Minnesota
American companies established in 2019